This is a list of ISO technical committees.

International Organization for Standardization (ISO) is a standards-making body, similar to the International Electrotechnical Commission (IEC). ISO works with National Committees in different countries in preparing and maintaining standards. ISO is the largest developer and publisher of international standards in the world.

Committee list
The ISO standards making process, similar to many other standards making processes, is handled by various technical committees (TC). The TCs are the key bodies that drive the standardization and comprise experts from the national committees and are a completely voluntary effort.

This list is intended to detail the various technical committees of ISO, the scope of the committees, their key members and the key relevance and outputs of these committees.

Other bodies developing standards or guides 
 CIE - International Commission on Illumination
 IIW - International Institute of Welding
 ISO/CASCO - Committee on conformity assessment
 ISO/COPOLCO - Committee on consumer policy
 ISO/REMCO - Committee on reference materials
 ISO/TMBG - Technical Management Board - groups
 IULTCS - International Union of Leather Technologists and Chemists Societies

See also 
 List of IEC technical committees
 List of ISO standards
 List of IEC standards
 List of EN standards
 International Classification for Standards
 Standardization

References

External links 
 ISO Website

International Organization for Standardization